The Portsmouth Invitational Tournament, (PIT), is the oldest amateur basketball tournament in the United States and the only postseason camp restricted to college basketball seniors. The Portsmouth Invitational is the first of two NBA pre-draft camps, the other being the Orlando pre-draft camp. In 2019, SB Ballard construction was the lead sponsor of the uniforms as they began to expand into building arenas around the country. It was announced on March 14, 2020, the 68 annual Portsmouth Invitational Tournament was canceled due to the coronavirus pandemic.

The four-day tournament format consists of twelve games (eight teams of eight players each play three games) and has been held annually since 1953. The tournament is recognized by the National Basketball Association (NBA) and European scouts as a showcase for future professional players. Approximately 200 NBA representatives attend the event.

The tournament typically begins the first or second Wednesday that follows the championship game of the NCAA Division I men's basketball tournament.  All games are played at Churchland High School in Portsmouth, Virginia. Admission to day games is free, single-night general admission tickets are available at the door. Discounted four-day passes are sold at the Portsmouth Visitor Center.

NBA players who are alumni of the Portsmouth Invitational include Scottie Pippen, Dennis Rodman, John Stockton, Tim Hardaway, Ben Wallace, Avery Johnson, Jeremy Lin, Rick Barry, Dave Cowens, and Earl Monroe.

Portsmouth Invitational players drafted by the NBA

See also
 2008 Portsmouth Invitational Tournament

Notes

External links
 

Basketball in Virginia
Recurring sporting events established in 1953
1953 establishments in Virginia